Sergio Donati (born 13 April 1933) is an Italian screenwriter. He has written for more than 70 films since 1952. He was born in Rome, Italy. He started as a writer and had some of his books optioned for film. He is well known for his collaboration with Italian director Sergio Leone, who encouraged him to take up screenwriting as a full-time career, and with Italian producer Dino de Laurentis.

{{Quote|text=What is film? In the first act, you hang a man up in a tree. In the second act, you throw stones at him. In the third act, he falls down. If he is alive, it is a comedy. If he is dead, it is a drama.|sign=Sergio Donati|source=from an interview}}

Selected filmography

 The Enemy (1952)
 For a Few Dollars More (1965) (uncredited)
 The Big Gundown (1966)
 Dollars for a Fast Gun (1966)
 Requiem for a Secret Agent (1966)
 Col cuore in gola (1967)
 Mission Stardust (1967)
 A Handful of Heroes (1967)
 Face to Face (1967)
 Seven Times Seven (1968)
 Once Upon a Time in the West (1968)
 Rebus (1969)
 The Weekend Murders (1970)
 Duck, You Sucker! (1971)
 Stanza 17-17 palazzo delle tasse, ufficio imposte (1971)
 Ben and Charlie (1972)
 Slap the Monster on Page One (1972)
 They Believed He Was No Saint (1972)
 The Heroes (1973)
 Mean Frank and Crazy Tony (1973)
 Mr. Hercules Against Karate (1973)
 The Beast (1974)
 Policewoman (1974)
 Shoot First, Die Later (1974)
 The Boss and the Worker (1975)
 Cry, Onion! (1975)
 L'Italia s'è rotta (1976)
 Il mostro (1977)
 Orca (1977)
 Holocaust 2000 (1977)
 Tough to Kill (1978)
 A Dangerous Toy (1979)
 Island of the Fishmen (1979)
 Buddy Goes West (1981)
 Count Tacchia (1982)
 Bonnie and Clyde Italian Style (1983)
 A tu per tu (1984)
 Casablanca, Casablanca (1985)
 Raw Deal (1986)
 Man on Fire (1987)
 They Call Me Renegade (1987)
 Rimini Rimini - Un anno dopo (1988)
 Blowing Hot and Cold (1989)
 Voyage of Terror: The Achille Lauro Affair (1990)
 Beyond Justice (1992)
 North Star (1996)
 Almost Blue (2000)
 The Sicilian Girl'' (2008)

References

External links

1933 births
Living people
20th-century Italian screenwriters
21st-century Italian screenwriters
Writers from Rome
Italian male screenwriters
20th-century Italian male writers
21st-century Italian male writers